Nili Airport is located about one kilometer of driving distance from the center of Nili, which is the capital of Daykundi Province in Afghanistan. It is a domestic airport under the country's Ministry of Transport and Civil Aviation (MoTCA), and serves the population of Daykundi Province. Security in and around the airport is provided by the Afghan National Security Forces. It has been used in the past mostly for emergency relief purposes.

A new terminal was added in 2011 with assistance and support from the International Security Assistance Force (ISAF). The airport can handle small civilian or military aircraft but not larger ones. Former Afghan President Ashraf Ghani had promised in 2014 that he would modernize Nili Airport, which would mean (among other things) upgrading its runway to an asphalt one.

Other nearby major airports to Nili are Chaghcharan Airport in neighboring Ghor Province to the north, Bamyan Airport in Bamyan Province to the northeast, Ghazni Airport in Ghazni Province to the east, Tarinkot Airport in Uruzgan Province to the south, Farah Airport in Farah Province to the west, and Herat International Airport in Herat Province to the northwest.

See also
List of airports in Afghanistan
List of airlines of Afghanistan

References

External links 
 
 
 Daykundi: A model for success in southern Afghanistan
 

Airports in Afghanistan
Daykundi Province